Rarities is a 2000 promo album by Emilíana Torrini.

Track listing
 Weird Friendless Kid
 If You Go Away (an adaptation of Jacques Brel's song Ne me quitte pas)
 7-Up Days
 Flirt
 Tuna Fish (Acoustic Version)
 Baby Blue (Rae & Christian Remix)
 Easy (Remix)
 Unemployed In Summertime (Remix)
 To Be Free (Future Shock Mix)

Critical reception

Jamie Gill of BBC said the songs on Rarities sounded out of date because of the downtempo songwriting. Alternatively, Ned Raggett of AllMusic said the album was a good way to introduce people to Emilíana's older music of the 1990s.

References

2000 compilation albums
Emilíana Torrini albums